Donald Roe Ross (June 8, 1922 – December 18, 2013) was a United States circuit judge of the United States Court of Appeals for the Eighth Circuit.

Education and career

Born in Orleans, Nebraska, Ross was in the United States Army as an Air Corps Major from 1942 to 1946. He received a Juris Doctor from the University of Nebraska College of Law in 1948. He was in private practice in Lexington, Nebraska from 1948 to 1953. He was a Republican Executive Committeeman in the state of Nebraska from 1952 to 1953 when he became Mayor of Lexington. Ross was the United States Attorney for the District of Nebraska from 1953 to 1956 and was in private practice in Omaha, Nebraska from 1956 to 1970. He was general counsel for the Republican Party of Nebraska from 1956 to 1958. He served as a Committeeman from Nebraska to the Republican National Committee from 1958 to 1970 and was Vice Chairman for his delegation from 1965 to 1970.

Federal judicial service

On November 30, 1970, Ross was nominated by President Richard Nixon to a seat on the United States Court of Appeals for the Eighth Circuit vacated by Judge Harry Blackmun. He was confirmed by the United States Senate on December 11, 1970, and received his commission on December 12, 1970. He assumed senior status on June 13, 1987, and died following an illness at his home in Omaha on December 18, 2013.

References

Sources
 

1922 births
2013 deaths
United States Army Air Forces personnel of World War II
Judges of the United States Court of Appeals for the Eighth Circuit
Mayors of places in Nebraska
Nebraska Republicans
People from Lexington, Nebraska
People from Harlan County, Nebraska
United States Army Air Forces officers
United States court of appeals judges appointed by Richard Nixon
20th-century American judges
University of Nebraska College of Law alumni